Cnemaspis flavolineata, also known as the yellow-striped rock gecko, Titiwangsa rock gecko, and Fraser's Hill rock gecko, is a species of gecko endemic to Malaysia.

References

flavolineata
Reptiles described in 1949